The 2009 Talaud Islands earthquake occurred on February 12 at 01:34 local time (February 11, 2009 at 17:34 UTC) near Talaud Islands (Indonesian: Kepulauan Talaud), Indonesia. This reverse-type shock had a moment magnitude of 7.2 and a maximum Mercalli intensity of VI (Strong). There were at least 2 dead, 64 people injured and 597 buildings damaged in Talaud Islands. This earthquake could also be felt in the Philippines.

See also
List of earthquakes in 2009
List of earthquakes in Indonesia

References

External links

Earthquakes in Indonesia
Talaud Islands earthquake, 2009
Talaud Islands Earthquake, 2009
February 2009 events in Asia